Morgante is a surname. Notable people with the surname include:

Barbara Morgante (born 1962), Italian businesswoman
Domenico Morgante (born 1956), Italian musicologist and organist
Vincenzo Morgante (born 1963), Italian journalist

Italian-language surnames